Armand Henning Carlsen (20 October 1905 – 8 May 1969) was a Norwegian speed skater who competed in the 1928 Winter Olympics.

In 1928 he finished fifth in the 5000 metres event. He also started in the abandoned 10000 metres competition. He held the world record in the 10,000 metres distance between 1928 and 1939, clocking in 17:17.4 minutes at the 1928 World Championships. His other personal best times were 46.5 seconds in the 500 metres (1931); 2.23.6 minutes in the 1500 metres (1928); and 8.34.0 minutes in the 5000 metres (1928).

He represented the club Oslo SK, and chaired the Norwegian Skating Association from 1956 to 1961. For his achievements in both speed skating and cycling, he was awarded the Egebergs Ærespris in 1929.

World record 

Source: SpeedSkatingStats.com

References

1905 births
1969 deaths
Norwegian male speed skaters
Olympic speed skaters of Norway
Speed skaters at the 1928 Winter Olympics
World record setters in speed skating
Norwegian male cyclists
Norwegian sports executives and administrators
Sportspeople from Oslo
World Allround Speed Skating Championships medalists
20th-century Norwegian people